The 1985–86 Alabama Crimson Tide men's basketball team represented the University of Alabama in the 1985–86 NCAA Division I men's basketball season. The team's head coach was Wimp Sanderson, who was in his sixth season at Alabama. The team played their home games at Coleman Coliseum in Tuscaloosa, Alabama. They finished the season 24–9, 13–5 in SEC play, finishing in a tie for second place.

The team lost forward Bobby Lee Hurt to graduation, but key additions were freshman forwards Michael Ansley from Jackson-Olin High School in Birmingham and William DeVaughn from Birmingham.

The Tide made it to the 1986 SEC men's basketball tournament final, but lost to Kentucky.  They received an at-large bid to the 1986 NCAA Division I men's basketball tournament, where they defeated Xavier and Illinois and reached the Sweet 16 for the second straight season.  In the Sweet 16, however, the Tide lost to Kentucky for the fourth time in the 1985–86 season.

Roster

Rankings

References 

Alabama Crimson Tide men's basketball seasons
Alabama
Alabama